The Men's Individual Road Race of the 2010 UCI Road World Championships cycling event took place on 3 October in Melbourne and concluded in Geelong, Australia. Thor Hushovd claimed the World Championship in a sprint finish, to become the first Norwegian to win the World Championship road race.

Route
The race started at Federation Square at Melbourne. For the first time, the World Championship route started and finished in different locations, with the riders traveling to Geelong before entering the finishing circuit. The route followed the West Gate Freeway and Princes Freeway, passing the Werribee River. Exiting at Bulban Road, the riders passed the You Yangs Regional Park, continued via Bacchus Marsh Road, then entered the Geelong circuit at Bell Parade. There were eleven laps around a 15.9 kilometre course through the Geelong suburbs, including South Geelong, Belmont, Highton, Queens Park, Newtown and Geelong West. The profile included two steep climbs, the first between 5 and 7 kilometres, the second between 9 and 11. The finish had a moderate uphill gradient.

Circuit practice, training and racing took place in Geelong from Thursday 23 September to Sunday 3 October.

Race Report 
The early breakaway consisted of 5 riders and was given a lead of up to 23 minutes by the peloton. In the break were Oleksandr Kvachuk, Mohammed Said Elammoury, Jackson Rodríguez, Diego Tamayo and Matt Brammeier. In between the break and the peloton rode Esad Hasanovic, who was chasing the lead group for several kilometres. He rode around 5 to 6 minutes behind them for some time. The breakaway almost lapped the peloton on the closing circuits, but the American and Belgian teams would increase the pace of the peloton and the gap began to fall. Elammoury was dropped by the other four with about 10 laps to go.

Kvachuk dropped Brammeier, Tamayo, and Rodriguez but by the end of the seventh lap the gap had fallen to about 5 minutes. Somewhat like the previous year's race, a large escape group went away, this time with 5 laps to go. The group contained 31 riders, including the previous year's champion Cadel Evans, his teammates Stuart O'Grady and Simon Gerrans, Edvald Boasson Hagen of Norway, Belgian Philippe Gilbert, Dane Matti Breschel and 5 Italians including Vincenzo Nibali and Filippo Pozzato. The group survived until lap nine although the peloton, led on by Spain, never let them get much of a gap. On the ninth lap Nibali attacked which decimated the breakaway and the peloton behind. Evans, Gilbert, and Pozzato were chasing behind at the end of the 9th lap, with the peloton 49 seconds behind Nibali. However, the peloton kept the pressure high and had pulled back all the attackers, including the early breakaway at the beginning of the last lap.

On the final ascent of the Montpelier climb, Gilbert made an attack and Evans immediately tried to jump into his slipstream. However, Gilbert got away from Evans, who was absorbed by a chase group containing Paul Martens of Germany, Alexander Kolobnev of Russia, Koos Moerenhout of The Netherlands, and Fränk Schleck of Luxembourg. The group was not well organized and was brought back by the remnants of the peloton and Gilbert was also caught with 2 kilometers to go.

Russian Vladimir Gusev and Slovenian Janez Brajkovič attacked just before the 1 kilometer to go banner and were joined by Dutchman Niki Terpstra. Terpstra attacked with about 800 meters to go as the Danes tried to set up a sprint for Breschel. However, as soon as Terpstra was caught Belgian Greg Van Avermaet launched the sprint. Breschel passed Van Avermaet on the left-hand side but Thor Hushovd of Norway passed Breschel and held on to the finish line for the victory. Breschel would settle for 2nd while Allan Davis of Australia passed Van Avermaet for the bronze medal.

National qualification

Nations in the top ten places of the UCI World Ranking on 15 August were permitted up to nine riders, although they were not permitted more than six unless they had at least seven riders in the rankings on that date. This happened to Kazakhstan, and as a result, one additional spot was awarded to Luxembourg, Slovenia and France (10th to 12 respectively in the rankings), although this concession had not been in the original documentation describing the allocation of places.

27 other qualifying nations were permitted no more than six riders. After allowing for the top ten in the world rankings, the continental rankings are to be used to identify sixteen further European nations, two countries from the UCI Africa Tour, five from the Americas, three Asian countries, and one representative of the Oceania tour.

Riders on teams that are members of a UCI ProTeam, but whose nation did not qualify, were eligible for additional places.

Nation qualification

Final classification

Riders who did not finish
79 riders failed to finish the race.

References

External links

Men's road race
UCI Road World Championships – Men's road race